The 2006 Utah Grand Prix was the fifth race for the 2006 American Le Mans Series season at Miller Motorsports Park.  It took place on July 15, 2006.

Official results

Class winners in bold.  Cars failing to complete 70% of winner's distance marked as Not Classified (NC).

Statistics
 Pole Position - #1 Audi Sport North America - 2:21.554
 Fastest Lap - #6 Penske Racing - 2:23.665
 Distance - 
 Average Speed -

External links
 

U
Utah Grand Prix